Melanitis libya, the violet-eyed evening brown, is a butterfly in the family Nymphalidae. It is found in Senegal, the Gambia, Guinea-Bissau, Mali, Guinea, Sierra Leone, Ivory Coast, Ghana, Nigeria, Niger, Chad, southern Sudan, Semuliki National Park, western Uganda and north-western Uganda, Ethiopia, Kenya, Tanzania, the Democratic Republic of the Congo (Shaba), Malawi, Zambia, Mozambique, and eastern Zimbabwe. The habitat consists of forests at altitudes between 600 and 900 meters.

Adults are on wing year round. There are wet- and dry-season forms.

The larvae possibly feed on Oxytenanthra abyssinica.

References

External links
 Die Gross-Schmetterlinge der Erde 13: Die Afrikanischen Tagfalter. Plate XIII 26 b

libya
Butterflies of Africa
Butterflies described in 1882
Taxa named by William Lucas Distant